Eurybrachys is a genus of bugs in the family Eurybrachidae (tribe Eurybrachini). First formally named in 1834 by French entomologist Félix Édouard Guérin-Méneville, Eurybrachys is the type genus of the family Eurybrachidae. The spelling Eurybrachis, by the author, is considered an unaccepted orthographic variant (spelling mistake). Species in this genus occur in Asia.

Species

, Fulgoromorpha Lists On the Web (FLOW) includes the following 16 species in the genus Eurybrachys:
Eurybrachys apicalis 
Eurybrachys apicata 
Eurybrachys dilatata 
Eurybrachys dotata 
Eurybrachys ferruginea 
Eurybrachys fletcheri 
Eurybrachys lepeletierii 
Eurybrachys manifesta 
Eurybrachys mysorensis 
Eurybrachys rubrescens 
Eurybrachys rubricincta 
Eurybrachys rubroornata 
Eurybrachys sanguinipes 
Eurybrachys spinosa  – type species (as Cicada spinosa )
Eurybrachys tomentosa 
Eurybrachys venusta 

FLOW lists the following additional synonyms under the spelling Eurybrachis:
Eurybrachis basalis  – synonym of Polydictya basalis 
Eurybrachis crudelis  – synonym of Messena crudelis 
Eurybrachis insignis  – synonym of Thessitus insignis 
Eurybrachis maculipennis  – synonym of Platybrachys maculipennis 
Eurybrachis pulverosa  – synonym of Messena pulverosa 
Eurybrachis reversa  – synonym of Purusha reversa

References

Eurybrachidae
Auchenorrhyncha genera
Hemiptera of Asia